Von Holleben is a surname. Notable people with the surname include:

 Jan von Holleben (born 1977), German photographer
 Kurt von Holleben (1894–1947), German chemist
 Theodor von Holleben (1838–1913), German diplomat